David Brandfellner (born 20 November 1992) is an Austrian handball player for HC Fivers Margareten and the Austrian national team.

He represented Austria at the 2020 European Men's Handball Championship.

References

External links

1992 births
Living people
Austrian male handball players
Handball players from Vienna